Steve Mills (previously Kennedy) is a fictional character on the New Zealand soap opera Shortland Street. He was portrayed by Andrew Binns and was part of the original core cast.

The character appeared in the first ever episode and stayed on the soap for two years, leaving the show in a dramatic fashion, exploding in a car crash alongside best friend Sam's (Rene Naufahu) wife T.P Aleni (Elizabeth Skeen). His death is remembered as one of the most iconic deaths on the soap's history. The character was largely used for comedic relief, developing into more dramatic storylines as he neared his death. Initial storylines saw the clumsy Steve fall head over heels for beautiful nurse Sarah Donnelly (Madeleine Lynch) and his subsequent depression at her death. His final storyline saw Steve try to overcome the growing attraction to his step mother and boss Carrie Burton (Lisa Crittenden) and denial that her children were not his.

Steve has been described as "lovable" and a Shortland Street "favorite". His comedy has since set a benchmark on the soap, with many characters based on his original sensitive new age characterisation including; Lionel Skeggins (John Leigh). Mike Galloway (Oliver Driver) and Kip Denton (Will Hall).

Storylines

Steve is introduced in May 1992 as the prankster nurse and flatmate to Sam Aleni (Rene Naufahu). Steve works under the reign of the mercilessly bossy Carrie Burton (Lisa Crittenden) and has a huge crush on Alison Raynor (Danielle Cormack). Steve is thrilled when Alison moves in but after the two share a kiss, they remain friends. Always loyal to Steve is his pet dog Killer, but disaster strikes in late 1992 when Killer is diagnosed with diabetes. Steve falls for Sarah Donnelly (Madeleine Lynch) and the two start to date. Sarah reveals she has cancer however and dies in Steve's arms at her birthday party.

In 1993, Steve grows depressed over Sarah's death and is shocked when his father Declan Kennedy (Kevin J. Wilson) arrived in town. The estranged father and son were at odds with Steve believing Declan had murdered his mother. Steve donated sperm to polar opposite Carrie, so she could have children. Carrie and Declan ended up falling in love and getting married but when the babies were born, Declan was too busy to father them and Steve willingly gave up his time to help his possible kids. Spending time with the Burtons, Steve fell in love with Carrie, but she was receiving threats from Declan's criminal past and with Declan having fled the country, Carrie grew close to Steve. Carrie decided to flee however and she and Steve shared a kiss in late 1993.

In 1994, Steve grew suspicious of Chris Warner (Michael Galvin) spending time with close friend Jo Jordan (Greer Robson), who was in a relationship with Stuart Neilson (Martin Henderson). After catching Chris out he learnt that Chris had really been visiting Carrie as he was the father of the babies. Steve was infuriated and while driving back from Leonard (Marton Csokas) and Gina's (Josephine Davison) farewell party, the two got into an argument and Steve accidentally drove the car off the road. Steve, Chris and Kirsty (Angela Dotchin) escaped but Steve went back for T.P (Elizabeth Skeen), only to be caught in the car as it violently exploded.

Steve and TP's death weighed heavily on Sam from the rest of his time on the soap, with his personality and appearance changing to a more ruthless and selfish persona gradually. Sam would gain the ownership to Steve's old house, and a dual funeral would be held a few days later for Steve and TP, where eulogies were given by Dr McKenna (Paul Gittins), Nick (Karl Burnett), Sam and Sam's brother Nat (Joseph Naufahu). Steve's good friend Carmen (Theresa Healey) spent some of her lottery winnings on a memoriam for Steve and TP When Shortland Street clinic had a renovation, a memorial plaque was placed on piece of the decor stating "dedicated to Steve Mills."

Reception
The scene featuring Steve and TP's death as voted by fans as one of the most iconic scenes of the soap. Steve was described at the time of his death as "One of Shortland Street's favourite characters".

References

Shortland Street characters
Fictional nurses
Television characters introduced in 1992
Male characters in television